Michael William Lely Kitson (30 January 1926 – 7 August 1998) was a British art historian who became an international authority on the work of the painter Claude Lorrain. 

His teaching career took in the Slade School of Fine Art and Courtauld Institute in London; he was at the latter from 1955 to 1985, ending as Professor of the History of Art from 1978 and deputy director from 1980.  He then moved to be Director of Studies at the Paul Mellon Centre for Studies in British Art in London.  In 1969, he organized the first major exhibition ever dedicated to Lorrain at the Laing Art Gallery in Newcastle-upon-Tyne, followed by the Hayward Gallery, London.

Early life and education
Michael Kitson was born on 30 January 1926, the son of the Reverend Bernard Meredith Kitson, a Church of England clergyman, and his wife Helen May Lely. The novelist Anthony Trollope and the painter Sir Peter Lely were among his ancestors. He was educated at Gresham's School and King's College, Cambridge, where he read English (1944-45 and 1948-50), and at the Courtauld Institute of Art (1950–1952).

Military service
His three years at King's College, Cambridge, were interrupted in 1945 when he was  commissioned into the Royal Engineers and attached to security intelligence Middle East, based in Egypt. He left the army in 1948 and returned to Cambridge.

Career
In 1952, he joined the Slade School of Fine Art at University College, London, as an assistant lecturer in the history of art. He moved on to the Courtauld Institute, London, as a lecturer from 1955 to 1967 and as a reader from 1967 to 1978. He became Professor of the History of Art there in 1978 and was deputy director of the Institute from 1980 to 1985. 

In 1985, Kitson became Director of Studies at the Paul Mellon Centre for Studies in British Art, London, a British educational charity with close links to Yale University. 

Kitson became an international authority on Claude Lorrain and organized the first Lorrain exhibition at the Hayward Gallery, London, in 1969. In 1978 he catalogued the Liber Veritatis, Lorrain's own drawings of his paintings, for the British Museum and later wrote the article on Lorrain for the Macmillan Dictionary of Art (1996). 

He shared an interest in 17th-century French painting with Anthony Blunt and later wrote the article on Blunt for the Oxford Dictionary of National Biography.

Family
On 8 July 1950, Kitson married Annabella, the daughter of John Leslie Cloudsley. They had two sons. In the 1980s Kitson became the partner of Judith Colton, an American art scholar.

Death
After his death in Islington, London, on 7 August 1998, a memorial service was held at St Clement Danes on 23 October 1998, with an address by Neil MacGregor, Director of the National Gallery.

Publications
J. M. W. Turner (Barnes & Noble, 1963) 
English painting (Art of the Western World), with Alexandra Wedgwood (Paul Hamlyn London, and Golden Press, New York 1964) 
Frans Hals (1965)
The Age of Baroque: Landmarks of the World's Art, Architecture, Sculpture, Portraits, Landscapes, Interior Decoration (Paul Hamlyn, London, 1966)
Claude Lorrain, Liber veritatis (British Museum Publications, London, 1978)  
The Art of Claude Lorrain (Arts Council, London, 1969) 
The Complete Paintings of Caravaggio (London, Abrams, 1967, new edition Weidenfeld & Nicolson, 1969 and 1986)
Rembrandt (Phaidon Press, editions in 1969, 1971, 1978 and 1994)
Discovering the Italian Baroque by Gabriele Finaldi and Michael Kitson (catalogue of Sir Denis Mahon's collection) (National Gallery, 1997) 
The Seeing Eye: Critical Writings on Art Michael Kitson (a collection of essays) (Mnemosyne Press, 2008) 
Complete Bibliography

References

1926 births
1998 deaths
Alumni of King's College, Cambridge
People educated at Gresham's School
Academics of the Courtauld Institute of Art
Alumni of the Slade School of Fine Art
Alumni of the Courtauld Institute of Art
People from Ealing